Mildred Ladner Thompson (June 24, 1918 – June 25, 2013) was an American journalist, writer and columnist. Her career included tenures at The Wall Street Journal, where she became one of its first female reporters, as well as the Associated Press and Tulsa World.

Early life and education
Thompson was born Mildred Diefenderfer in Allentown, Pennsylvania, in 1918, the only child of Orlando and Mary Diefenderfer. She worked at an Allentown newspaper while completing her bachelor's degree at Moravian College. Thompson next received a master's degree in journalism from the University of Wisconsin–Madison.

Career

She was hired by the Associated Press in 1945, shortly after finishing graduate school. Thompson worked out of the Associated Press' bureau in Philadelphia, Pennsylvania. She interviewed U.S. President Franklin D. Roosevelt and his wife, First Lady of the United States Eleanor Roosevelt, while with the AP.

Her work for the AP caught the attention of The Wall Street Journal, which hired her in 1945 as a reporter for its bureau in Washington D.C., becoming one of the newspaper's first female reporters. She was the only woman on the staff of the WSJ at the time of her hiring. Her assignments included the aviation, the Truman administration, and transportation beats. In November 1947, Thompson was flown to California, where she witnessed and covered the first, and only, flight of the Spruce Goose (Hughes H-4 Hercules), the prototype aircraft created by Howard Hughes.

Thompson met her first husband, the late John Ladner, a U.S. Navy commander from Tulsa, Oklahoma, while working in Washington. She and Ladner, who later became a Tulsa district judge, decided to leave Washington and move to Oklahoma shortly after their 1950 wedding. She worked as an Oklahoma-based correspondent for several national publications. She also wrote for several Tulsa-based organizations, including the Tulsa Boys Home and Tulsa Ballet. She was hired by the Gilcrease Museum to write biographies of the artists, "O. C. Seltzer, Painter of the Old West" and "William de la Montagne Cary, Artist on the Missouri River," which were published by the University of Oklahoma. She also authored a history of the Tulsa City-County Library, "Tulsa City-County Library: 1912–1991," which was published in 1991.

Thompson was hired by the Tulsa World as a book editor and columnist in 1977. She was highly involved with the Tulsa Press Club while on staff.

She lived in Tulsa for 45 years until 1995, when she moved to Sarasota, Florida with her second husband, T.K. Thompson. She continued to write biographies of new residents of her Florida retirement community.

Death

Millie Thompson died in Sarasota, Florida, on June 25, 2013, at the age of 95. She was survived by her three children, Mary Pat Robertson, Helen Ladner, and Edward Ladner. She had been widowed by both her first and second husbands, John Ladner, who died in 1983, and T.K. Thompson.

References

1918 births
2013 deaths
American non-fiction writers
American columnists
American newspaper reporters and correspondents
Associated Press reporters
Journalists from Oklahoma
Journalists from Pennsylvania
Moravian University alumni
People from Sarasota, Florida
The Wall Street Journal people
University of Wisconsin–Madison School of Journalism & Mass Communication alumni
Writers from Allentown, Pennsylvania
Writers from Tulsa, Oklahoma